Jody Fannin (born 4 September 1993) is a British auto racing driver. He competed in the European Le Mans Series in 2017, winning the GTE Championship with Rob Smith driving for JMW Motorsport in a Ferrari 488 GTE. He was the 2012 British GT GT4-class champion, along with Warren Hughes, driving for Team WFR in a Ginetta G50.

Racing career

Early career
Born in Chertsey, Surrey, Fannin first appeared in karting in 2006, competing in the Bayford Kart Club Summer Sprint Championship Minimax, and finishing sixth, moving to the Stars of Tomorrow National Championship in 2007, to compete in the Rotax Mini Max class, finishing 32nd after competing in 2 rounds. 2008 would prove to be more successful: he won both Bayford Meadows Winter Championship and the Midland Championships Minimax, finished fifth in the London Cup's Rotax Mini Max class, and finished tenth in the BRDC Stars of Tomorrow MiniMax championship. He also finished ninth in the Super One Minimax in 2009, in addition to a 19th-place finish in the Mini Max class of the MSA Kartmasters Grand Prix. For 2010, he moved into car racing, joining the Ginetta Junior Championship with TJ Motorsport, where he immediately proved his pace: he set fastest lap at round 1 at Thruxton, then went on to win the third round of the season at the Brands Hatch GP circuit, eventually finishing fourth overall, and was the top rookie in the series by a large margin. Following that successful debut season, he moved into the Ginetta G50 Cup, driving for Team PYRO, and finishing third overall.

2012–2013
For 2012, he made the move to the British GT series, driving a GT4-class Ginetta G50, but now for Team WFR, partnering the much more experienced Warren Hughes. The partnership was successful right from the start, as the duo won the first two events of the season, both held at Oulton Park. Fannin and Hughes went into the penultimate round of the season, held at Silverstone, only needing a fourth-place finish to take the title, and his win in that race sealed the title, even though he had only completed six laps of the track prior to the event. Fannin and Hughes would finish on 243.5 points, 84.5 points ahead of Zoë Wenham in second place, having won eight of the ten races that season. Following his championship victory, he entered the final three rounds of the Dutch GT Championship, still driving for Team WFR in the G50, held at Zandvoort Circuit. It proved to be a successful venture, with a fourth-place finish in the first sprint race, fourteenth (and last) in the second sprint race after a mechanical failure, and a second place in the third, and final, race of the weekend. He also entered the final round of the Blancpain Endurance Series, held at the Spanish Circuito de Navarra, driving a Ferrari 458 Italia GT3 entered by Scuderia Vittoria. It would not be a successful debut, as the team, with Fannin partnered for the race by David McDonald and Danny Candia, failing to finish, and retiring after 35 laps.

In 2013, following his BRDC Rising Star award, he made the step up to the GT3 class of the series, now driving for JRM Racing in their Nissan GT-R, signing in a last-minute deal to compete in the opening round of the season, driving solo, which incurred an additional 20-second pit stop penalty. He finished twelfth in race one, and eleventh in race two, both positions being outside of the points. In June, it was announced that he would race for JMB Racing in a Nissan GT-R GT3 at Paul Ricard and the Nürburgring in the Blancpain Endurance Series, driving alongside Nicolas Misslin and Nicolas Marroc. It would not prove to be a successful debut, however, as the trio retired after 22 laps, and were not classified. He returned to JRM Racing again for the 24 Hours of Spa, this time alongside Charles Bateman, Matt Bell and Humaid Al-Masaood, but brake issues dogged their race, and they were eventually forced to retire with a driveline problem, as the car stopped on track. Following this event, he competed in the Magny-Cours round of the GT Tour with Julien Briché, driving for JMB Racing. They retired from the first race, before finishing eleventh in the second. Fannin then partnered Steven Kane for JRM Racing in the Hockenheimring round of the ADAC GT Masters series, taking 18th in the first race, and 14th in the second. Fannin finished the season partnering Jean-Philippe Dayraut in the Paul Ricard round of the GT Tour, and, after narrowly missing out on pole, he was not classified in the first race after contact in the first corner, they took fourth in the second race. This result saw Fannin classified 23rd in the driver's championship.

2014–2016 

In 2014 he made a few one off appearances including a points finish in the Silverstone round of the Blancpain Endurance Series driving a Bentley Continental GT3 with James Appleby and Steve Tandy. He followed this up with a win and a second place in the Silverstone round of the International GT Open alongside Darren Turner in a TF Sport Aston Martin V12 Vantage GT3. After being selected for the Aston Martin Racing Young Driver Academy, he joined TF Sport for a full season of British GT in 2015 alongside Andrew Jarman in an  Aston Martin V12 Vantage GT3. They achieved 2 podiums and a pole position, finishing 7th in the championship. Jody joined Pete Littler for a part season of British GT in 2016, again in an  Aston Martin V12 Vantage GT3 and rounded off the year with a podium alongside Francesco Sini in the Barcelona round of the International GT Open with Italian Aston Martin Racing team, Solaris Motorsport.

2017 
Jody was selected as a full member of the BRDC and  joined JMW Racing for a full season of the European Le Mans Series, starting the season in the team's venerable Ferrari 458 Italia GTE alongside Rob Smith and Rory Butcher, achieving an emotional win in the seven year old car's final appearance at Monza against the newer spec 2017 GTE cars joined by Jonny Cocker who replaced Butcher for the round. The team will switch to a new Ferrari 488 GTE from the A1 Ring round. After a string of podiums, Jody along with Rob Smith were crowned European Le Mans Series GTE Champions in a chaotic race at Portimao in Portugal where a second place was enough to secure the title.

Racing record

Complete European Le Mans Series results
(key) (Races in bold indicate pole position; results in italics indicate fastest lap)

Complete 24 Hours of Le Mans results

Personal life
He was named after Jody Scheckter, and has a South African father, and an English mother. His family moved to South Africa when he was one, moving back to the UK seven years later. Away from motorsport, he is a driver coach (ARDS instructor) specialising in coaching Ginetta Junior drivers.

References

External links
 
 
 

1993 births
Living people
Sportspeople from Chertsey
English racing drivers
British GT Championship drivers
Blancpain Endurance Series drivers
ADAC GT Masters drivers
24 Hours of Spa drivers
International GT Open drivers
Britcar drivers
European Le Mans Series drivers
FIA World Endurance Championship drivers
24 Hours of Le Mans drivers
Ginetta GT4 Supercup drivers
Ginetta Junior Championship drivers